The 1968 Croydon Council election took place on 9 May 1968 to elect members of Croydon London Borough Council in London, England. The whole council was up for election and the Conservative party gained overall control of the council. Turnout in this election was 36.2%.

Background

Election result

Ward results

Addiscombe

Bensham Manor

Broad Green

Central

Coulsdon East

East

New Addington

Norbury

Purley

Sanderstead & Selsdon

Sanderstead North

Shirley

South Norwood

Thornton Heath

Upper Norwood

Waddon

West Thornton

Whitehorse Manor

Woodcote & Coulsdon West

Woodside

References

1968
1968 London Borough council elections